Gauvin is a surname. Notable people with this surname include:

 Anthony Gauvin (born 1973), French football player
  (born 1944), French author
 Crystal Gauvin, American archer
 Gauvin Alexander Bailey, American-Canadian art historian
 Jean Gauvin (1945–2007), Canadian politician
 Joël Gauvin (born 1939), French ice hockey player
 Karina Gauvin, Canadian soprano
 Lise Gauvin (born 1940), Canadian writer
 Marshall Gauvin (1881–1978), Canadian atheist author and speaker
 Mickey Gauvin, drummer with the International Submarine Band
 Robert Gauvin, Canadian politician
 Réal Gauvin (born 1935), Canadian politician
 Valérie Gauvin (born 1996), French football player
 William-Henry Gauvin (1913–1994), Canadian chemical engineer

See also
 Cheval Gauvin, legendary horse
 , Canada